XHETD-FM/XETD-AM is a radio station on 92.5 FM and 570 AM in Tecuala, Nayarit, Mexico. The station is owned by Alica Medios, the media arm of Grupo Empresarial Alica, and carries a grupera format known as La Patrona. Programming is aimed at the Escuinapa, Sinaloa, area, to the northwest of Tecuala and on the edge of the FM signal contour.

History

XHETD began broadcast as XETD-AM 1450, with a concession awarded to José Manuel Navarrete Saavedra on December 20, 1954. By the 1980s, it was owned by Pedro Aguiar Villegas, who in turn sold the station to Alica in the early 2000s. In 2008, XETD relocated from 1450 kHz to 570, allowing it to increase power from 250 watts to 5,000.

The station received authorization to move to FM as XHETD-FM 92.5 in 2011, but it was required to maintain its AM station, as communities could lose radio service were the AM station to go off the air.

After a previous stint as La Patrona, XHETD changed names to Tuba Stereo in late 2019. In February 2022, it once again took on the La Patrona moniker, with a new studio and programming for the Escuinapa area of southern Sinaloa.

References

External links
La Patrona 92.5 FM Facebook
Grupo Empresarial Alica

Radio stations in Nayarit
Radio stations in Mexico with continuity obligations